The 2006 Florida State Seminoles football team represented Florida State University during the 2006 NCAA Division I-A football season. The team was coached by Bobby Bowden and played their home games at Doak Campbell Stadium in Tallahassee, Florida. They were members of the Atlantic Coast Conference (ACC) and the Atlantic Division.

The Seminoles finished with an overall record of 7–6, which was head coach Bobby Bowden's worst record since going 5–6 in 1976, his first year as Florida State's head coach. This record was later reduced to 2–6 after 5 wins from the season were vacated as punishment for violations of NCAA rules.

Pre-season
The Seminoles were picked by the ACC media as the preseason favorite to win the ACC's Atlantic Division.  Sophomore quarterback Drew Weatherford finished fourth in voting for the ACC's Preseason Player of the Year.

Mid-season awards
Buster Davis named as a semi-finalist for The Lott Trophy.

Post-season awards
Buster Davis named to American Football Coaches Association All-America Team, Walter Camp All-American (2nd Team), Atlantic Coast Sports Media Association All-ACC (1st Team)
Myron Rolle named Sporting News Freshman ACC Defensive Player of the Year, Sporting News Freshman All-American (1st Team)
Brandon Warren named to Sporting News Freshman All-ACC Team, Sporting News Freshman All-American (3rd Team)
Everette Brown named to Sporting News Freshman All-ACC Team, Sporting News Freshman All-American (2nd Team)
Dekoda Watson named to Sporting News Freshman All-ACC Team
Jamie Robinson named to Sporting News Freshman All-ACC Team
Greg Carr named to Atlantic Coast Sports Media Association All-ACC (2nd Team)
Andre Fluellen named to Atlantic Coast Sports Media Association All-ACC (2nd Team)

Schedule

Rankings

Recruits

Starting lineup
Head coach: Bobby Bowden (31st year)

Offense

Offensive coordinator: Jeff Bowden (6th year)
Offensive scheme: Pro-style

Defense
Defensive coordinator: Mickey Andrews (23rd year)
Base defense: 4–3 Multiple

Special teams

Injured players

Other coaches
Executive Head Coach/Linebackers – Kevin Steele
Assistant Head Coach/Running Backs – Billy Sexton
Defensive Tackles – Odell Haggins
Tight Ends/Recruiting Coordinator – John Lilly
Quarterbacks – Daryl Dickey
Offensive Line – Mark McHale
Defensive Line – Jody Allen
Graduate Assistant/Defense – James Colzie
Graduate Assistant/Offense – Ron Dugans
Graduate Assistant/Strength and Conditioning – Tim Fertig
Strength and Conditioning – Jon Jost
Executive Assistant/Academic Standards – Dan Marwood

Game summaries

Miami
Pregame Line: Miami −3.5

Florida State played their season opener against the rival University of Miami Hurricanes on Labor Day for the third straight year. It was also the third time the team opened their Atlantic Coast Conference play with Miami. Much like the previous two Labor Day meetings, the 2006 edition of the game was a defensive struggle for both teams. The Seminoles trailed 3–10 at the half, but held Miami scoreless in the third and fourth quarters and took the lead with a 33-yard field goal late in the game. The 'Noles preserved the win when cornerback Michael Ray Garvin intercepted Miami quarterback Kyle Wright's pass with 29 seconds remaining.

Troy
Pregame Line: Florida State −30

After winning at Miami, the Seminoles returned home to Bobby Bowden Field at Doak Campbell Stadium to take on the Troy Trojans. The Seminole offense continued to struggle, and the 'Noles found themselves shut out in the first half and down by three points to a team many expected them to blow out. After Troy scored early in the fourth quarter to take the lead, 17–10, ABC began to cut into their broadcast of #1 Ohio State at #2 Texas to update viewers on "the major upset brewing in Tallahassee." The Seminoles scored two touchdowns in the final 6:12 and avoided the upset, winning 24–17.

Clemson
Pregame Line: Florida State −2.5

Dubbed "Bowden Bowl VIII," Tommy Bowden's Clemson Tigers traveled to Doak Campbell Stadium for a pivotal ACC match-up with his father's Seminole team. Clemson had lost to ACC foe Boston College in overtime the week before, and was looking to reinsert themselves into the ACC Championship picture. Again, the Florida State offense struggled. The only points scored by the 'Noles in the first half of the game were scored by cornerback Tony Carter, who returned a blocked extra point for 2 points and a blocked field goal for a touchdown. With the game tied 20–20 late in the fourth quarter, Clemson switched to a no-huddle offense and running back James Davis gashed the unprepared Seminole defense for 47 yards, setting up a Clemson score with eight seconds left on the clock. Backup Seminole quarterback Xavier Lee entered the game and attempted a hail mary pass, but the ball was batted to the ground and Clemson left Tallahassee with a 27–20 win. It was the first time Clemson had won at Doak Campbell Stadium since 1989 and the third time Tommy Bowden had beaten his father since becoming Clemson's head coach in 1999.

Rice
Pregame Line: Florida State −17

The Seminoles rebounded from their loss to Clemson by routing the winless Rice Owls in front of one of the smallest crowds to attend a football game at Doak Campbell Stadium in years. For the first time in the 2006 season, FSU scored a touchdown on their opening drive. After a quick Rice touchdown tied the game, the 'Noles went on to score 48 unanswered points and earned a 55–7 victory. Backup quarterback Xavier Lee saw meaningful playing time for the first time in the season, and wide receiver Greg Carr caught two touchdowns. The Florida State running game, which had been anemic all season, exploded for 287 yards.

NC State
Pregame Line: Florida State −10.5

Florida State traveled to Raleigh, NC to take on the North Carolina State Wolf Pack in a Thursday night game that was televised by ESPN. NC State, coached by former FSU assistant Chuck Amato, was seeking its second straight win over a ranked ACC opponent after suffering embarrassing losses to Akron and Southern Miss earlier in the season. FSU attempted to use more motion on offense and seemed determined to establish a running game, despite mixed results from running backs Lorenzo Booker and Antone Smith. After the Seminole defense stopped the Wolf Pack from scoring one yard away from the end zone, 'Nole quarterback Drew Weatherford led the offense on a 14-play, 99-yard scoring drive to give FSU a 20–10 lead in the third quarter. It was not enough, as NC State quarterback Daniel Evans led his team to two scores late in the game to put the Wolf Pack up 24–20. With one last chance, FSU began to drive down the field but Weatherford's pass was tipped and intercepted with 2:27 remaining. Utilizing the new NCAA clock rules to their fullest advantage, NC State was able to take three knees and run out the clock. With the win, Amato is now 4–3 against Bowden since becoming the head coach at NC State.

The loss, Florida State's second to an unranked opponent in the 2006 season, caused the Seminoles to tumble out of polls and ignited a wave of criticism directed mostly at the FSU coaching staff. Fans on message boards around the Internet voiced their displeasure, and the downward spiral of the program was the subject of many newspaper articles and radio call-in shows for days after the game. When head coach Bobby Bowden was asked in an interview if he was rooting for ACC conference foe Wake Forest to beat Clemson that Saturday (thereby giving FSU a much better chance of returning to the ACC Championship game), he responded "I have to go with blood." This drew the ire of many fans who were already angry with Bowden for refusing to demote his son, FSU offensive coordinator Jeff Bowden, after six years of underachieving Florida State offensive performances.

Duke
Pregame Line: Florida State −22.5

FSU had no problem dispatching of the winless Duke Blue Devils, and used the game to get their younger players valuable experience. The 'Noles struck first early when linebacker Lawrence Timmons returned a Duke fumble 37 yards for a touchdown. After beginning the game with six straight incompletions, QB Drew Weatherford had his most solid performance of the season, going 16/18 for the remainder of time he was in the game. Weatherford threw four touchdown passes (three to WR Greg Carr) and had no interceptions. Backup QB Xavier Lee entered the game in the second quarter but struggled, throwing three picks. For the second time in the 2006 season, the Seminoles blocked an opponent's extra point attempt and returned it for two points.

Florida State continued to be hit hard by injuries. Linebacker Geno Hayes went down with an apparent knee injury in the first quarter, making him the fifth FSU linebacker this season to suffer a serious injury. Later tests revealed that Hayes sprained his MCL, and his status for the Boston College game is unknown. In addition, tight end Brandon Warren suffered a hamstring pull in the second quarter and is doubtful to play this week.

Boston College
Pregame Line: Florida State −7

Florida State lost another close ACC game at home against Boston College. The team wore special black uniforms and the fans wore black to honor the Seminole Tribe of Florida. A new statue, also honoring the Tribe was unveiled outside Doak Campbell Stadium on the day before the game. A special guest from the Seminole Tribe planted Chief Osceola's spear during the pre-game ceremony.

Maryland
Pregame Line: Florida State −3.5

Starting sophomore quarterback Xavier Lee for the injured Drew Weatherford, Florida State was unable to break out of its funk, losing its second straight game and fourth out of five.  Lee was impressive in his start, completing 22 of 36 passes for 286 yards and 2 touchdowns.  Receiver Chris Davis also had a good game, catching 8 passes for 132 yards and 1 touchdown.  But it wasn't enough against a determined Maryland Terrapins squad.  Trailing 27–24, the Seminoles had an opportunity to tie the game up in the final minute, but a 46-yard field goal attempt by kicker Gary Cismesia was blocked by Maryland, sealing the win for Maryland.  The defeat dropped Florida State to 4–4 on the season and 2–4 in the ACC.

Virginia
Pregame Line: Florida State −12.5
Xavier Lee started for the second consecutive game, picking up his first win as a starter. Drew Weatherford played in the fourth quarter. Tony Carter's INT return for a TD was FSU's first since A.J. Nicholson accomplished the feat during last year's game against Boston College. This was FSU's first defensive shutout since blanking Notre Dame in South Bend, in 2003.

Wake Forest
Pregame Line: Florida State −8.5
Quarterbacks Xavier Lee and Drew Weatherford combined for 4 costly interceptions as Wake Forest beat Florida State for the first time in ACC play. The 30–0 loss was the worst in years for the Seminoles and was also the first time Bobby Bowden had been shut out in Tallahassee since he became the head coach of Florida State 31 years earlier. While Wake Forest moved to 9–1 and continued their Cinderella season, FSU fell to 5–5 and finished with a 3–5 record in the ACC – their first losing record since joining the conference in 1992. Three days after the game, Florida State offensive coordinator Jeff Bowden announced that he would be resigning at the end of the season. It was later revealed that Bowden will receive a $537,000 buyout from Seminole Boosters, Inc., in exchange for stepping down.

Western Michigan
Pregame Line: Florida State −16
Florida State beat Western Michigan 28–20 on a sunny afternoon in Tallahassee, allowing Florida State to become bowl eligible for the 25th consecutive season. The Homecoming game was watched by about 70,000 fans in Doak Campbell Stadium. Sophomore quarterback Drew Weatherford started but was relieved in the second quarter by Xavier Lee, who threw two touchdown passes to WR Greg Carr. RB Antone Smith started for the first time in his college career, but was lost for the remainder of the season when he dislocated his elbow on the Seminoles' first offensive series. Lorenzo Booker, who was originally going to be used as a slot receiver in the game, reclaimed the rushing duties from that point on. Florida State LB Lawrence Timmons broke open a close game in the third quarter when he scored on a 22-yard interception return. Western Michigan pulled to within eight points late in the fourth quarter and twice converted on 4th-and-10 during their last drive of the game. However, Broncos QB Ryan Cubit's pass into the end zone on 4th-and-29 as time expired was incomplete, and the Seminoles preserved the victory.

Florida
Pregame Line: Florida −8.5
Florida State finished its regular season against archrival #4 Florida Gators. Florida took a 14–0 lead in the first half, but Florida State came back to tie the game at 14–14 at the beginning of the fourth quarter. Florida scored the final touchdown of the game a few minutes later to win 21–14. The Gators extended their winning streak over FSU to three games with just their second win at Doak Campbell Stadium in the past 20 years. FSU entered the game unranked after having its worst season since the early 1980s. Former Seminole great Ron Simmons gave LB Buster Davis permission to wear his retired #50 jersey for the game.

Emerald Bowl vs. UCLA
Florida State travelled to San Francisco, CA to take on and defeat (44–27) UCLA in the Emerald Bowl on December 27, 2006.

NCAA probation
On March 6, 2009, Florida State was put on probation for four years by National Collegiate Athletic Association for major violations in its athletics program. The school was required to reduce scholarships and vacate records during the 2006 and 2007 seasons. The violations included more than 60 student-athletes across 10 sports involving in the academic fraud, "as well as impermissible benefits, unethical conduct by three former academic support services staff members, and a failure to monitor by the university."

References

Florida State
Florida State Seminoles football seasons
Redbox Bowl champion seasons
Florida State Seminoles football